Puriyadha Anandam Puthithaga Arambam is a 2015 Tamil romantic drama film written and directed by Syed Ibrahim, which stars Krish and Srushti Dange. The film released on 5 June 2015.

Cast
 Krish as Bharathi
 Srushti Dange as Nila
 Nitish Veera as Bharathi's friend

Production
Puriyadha Anandam Puthithaga Arambam is named after a line from the Mouna Ragam song "Chinna Chinna Vanna Kuyil". Producer Ibrahim Rowther spotted Krish in the "Aga Naga" song in Ko (2011) and offered him the chance of portraying the lead role in his production, Puriyatha Anantham Puthithaga Aarambam. The film, a romantic love story featuring him alongside Srushti Dange, began shoot in late 2012 but was only released in June 2015.

Soundtrack

Critical reception
The film received negative reviews from critics with the New Indian Express stating "the lackluster screenplay abounds in such situations, unconvincing and hard to digest" and "the amateur treatment doesn’t help matters", concluding it's an "effort gone haywire".

References

2015 films
2010s Tamil-language films
Indian romantic drama films
2015 directorial debut films
Films scored by A. R. Reihana
2015 romantic drama films